Leander Paes and Radek Štěpánek were the defending champions, but did not participate this year.

Simon Aspelin and Todd Perry won in the final 6–3, 6–3 against Jordan Kerr and Jim Thomas.

Seeds

Draw

Draw

External links
Draw

2005
2005 ATP Tour
2005 Millennium International Tennis Championships